{{Infobox martial artist
| name            = Gokor Chivichyan
| image           = Gokor Chivichyan (2018) - 3.JPG
| image_size      = 
| alt             = 
| caption         = 
| birth_name      = Գոքոր Չիվիչյան
| birth_date      = 
| birth_place     = Yerevan, Armenian SSR, Soviet Union
| death_date      = 
| death_place     = 
| death_cause     = 
| other_names     = 
| residence       = North Hollywood, California
| nationality     = American
| height          = 
| weight          = 
| weight_class    = 
| reach           = 
| style           = Sambo, Judo, Catch wrestling, Jujutsu, Freestyle wrestling
| stance          = 
| fighting_out_of = 
| team            = 
| trainer         = 
| rank            =  9th Dan Black Belt In Judo (USJJF) 9th Dan Black Belt in Kyokushin Budokai 6th Degree Black Belt and 1st Razryad Grand Master In Sambo  7th Degree Black Belt In JujutsuMaster of sports in Wrestling| wrestling       = 
| years_active    = 
| occupation      = Trainer, fighter
| university      = 
| spouse          = 
| relatives       = Gary Chivichyan and Arthur Chivichyan, sons
| students        = Karo Parisyan, Manvel Gamburyan, Ronda Rousey, Karen Darabedyan, Sako Chivitchian, Roman Mitichyan, Neil Melanson, Tony Halme
| club            = 
| school          = 
| website         = 
| boxrec          = 
| sherdog         = 
| footnotes       = 
| updated         = 
}}

Gokor Chivichyan (born May 10, 1963) is an Armenian-born American judo, submission grappling, and mixed martial arts instructor. Chivichyan currently trains professional and amateur fighters at the Hayastan MMA Academy in North Hollywood, California, United States. With his extensive knowledge in judo, sambo, catch wrestling, freestyle wrestling and Brazilian jiu-jitsu, Chivichyan is considered to be one of the most complete grapplers of all time.

Career
Chivichyan, the youngest of three brothers, was born in Yerevan, Armenia. Chivichyan began his training as a young child in Soviet Armenia, winning national junior titles in judo, sambo, and wrestling. At the age of 17, Chivichyan relocated to Los Angeles, California where he continued his training in catch wrestling under Gene LeBell, a famous catch wrestler who learned from Lou Thesz and Ed "Strangler" Lewis, and was the United States' first Judo champion. Throughout the 1980s and early 1990s, Chivichyan traveled and competed in the Soviet Union and throughout Europe, Japan, Thailand, and Mexico. With the opening of the Hayastan MMA Academy in 1991, Gokor retired undefeated from professional fighting, and focused his time on teaching.

In 1997, Chivichyan came out of retirement for a superfight organized by the World Fighting Federation. His opponent was intended to be Akira Maeda, but the promoters were unable to sign him and instead matched Chivichyan against Bill Maeda, who was dubbed "Mr. Maeda". Chivichyan submitted Maeda via armbar in 50 seconds.

He was named by Black Belt Magazine'' as “Judo Instructor of the Year” in 1998 and received the prestigious “Hall of Fame” spot. Since then he has produced in his school a new generation of fighters, such as Manvel Gamburyan, Sako Chivitchian, Neil Melanson, Karen Darabedyan, Roman Mitichyan, Ronda Rousey, and Karo Parisyan, who have competed in the arena of the UFC, WEC, King of the Cage, Olympic and all National Judo Championships.

In February 2005, the United States Ju-Jitsu Federation (ISJJF) awarded him the rank of 7th dan in judo.

To the great surprise of many, Chivichyan competed again at the 2008 USJA/USJF Winter Nationals, the first National Judo Championship endorsed by both organizations. He took Gold after defeating Gary Butts by uchi mata in the finals.

After many more years away from competition, Gokor competed at the 2019 IBJJF Pan American Brazilian Jiu Jitsu Championships at the Masters Black Belt level. He defeated former BJJ Black Belt World Champion, V. Oliveira, to take Gold. In August 2019, Gokor again competed at the IBJJF Masters Brazilian Jiu Jitsu World Championship, once again defeating all of his opponents to take Gold. He finished the year competing at the SJJIF Brazilian Jiu Jitsu Gi and No-Gi World Championships in Long Beach, California, taking Gold in both categories. With these victories, Gokor is perhaps the only individual to take Gold medals at elite international competitions in all three of the primary submission grappling arts: Judo, Sambo, and Brazilian Jiu Jitsu.  Gokor remains undefeated in competition.

Mixed martial arts record

|-
| Win
| align=center| 1–0
| Bill Maeda
| Submission (armbar)
| WFF - World Fighting Federation
| 
| align=center| 1
| align=center| 0:50
| Birmingham, Alabama United states
| 
|-

References

External links
 
 

1963 births
Living people
Sportspeople from Yerevan
Soviet emigrants to the United States
American people of Armenian descent
American catch wrestlers
Armenian male mixed martial artists
American male mixed martial artists
Mixed martial artists utilizing jujutsu
Mixed martial artists utilizing judo
Mixed martial artists utilizing sambo
Mixed martial artists utilizing Kyokushin kaikan
Mixed martial artists utilizing catch wrestling
Mixed martial artists utilizing freestyle wrestling
Armenian male judoka
American male judoka
Armenian jujutsuka
American jujutsuka
Armenian sambo practitioners
American sambo practitioners
Armenian wrestlers
American wrestlers